The Rogachev–Zhlobin offensive was a Soviet-led military offensive that took place from 21 to 26 February 1944 within the Eastern Front of World War II. Soviet forces aimed to advance through Rogachev and defeat the German 9th Army of Army Group Centre, which culminated with the movements of other units in preparation of Operation Bagration.

Background
Germany captured Rogachev during the beginning stages of Operation Barbarossa. The area of Rogachev was part of Adolf Hitler's Rogachev-Vetibsk line during the later stages of the war and was named a stronghold. The line did prove effective, holding the Soviet troops in a stalemate for a month.

The Operation
The operation to take Rogachev and Zhlobin took place simultaneously with another separate operation to take Vitebsk, starting on 21 February. During the initial stages of the offensive, Marshal Rokossovsky of the 1st Belorussian Front was able to drive a 16-mile wedge into the German lines, liberating Zhlobin and at least 30 other villages and towns. In an attempt to seal the gap, the German commander threw fresh troops into the lines. About fourteen separate counterattacks were made, culminating in about 2,500 losses. Though the Germans fighting was considered fierce, the Soviet troops surged forward after the counterattacks and seized 13 tanks, 40 guns, and 8,000 mines along with large amounts of prisoners.

References

External links
 avwsu Rogachev-Zhlobin Operation
 dupuy institute
 ssilrc
 

battles and operations of the Eastern Front of World War II
battles and operations of the Soviet–German War
conflicts in 1944
strategic operations of the Red Army in World War II